Odoacer (– 15 March 493 AD), also spelled Odovacer or Odovacar, was a Germanic soldier and statesman of barbarian background, who deposed the Western Roman child emperor Romulus Augustulus and became Rex/Dux of Italy (476–493). Odoacer's overthrow of Romulus Augustulus is traditionally seen as marking the end of the Western Roman Empire as well as Ancient Rome.

Though the real power in Italy was in his hands, he represented himself as the client of the emperor in Constantinople, Zeno. Odoacer often used the Roman honorific patrician, granted by Zeno, but was referred to as a king or duke in many documents, so is not clear which was his actual charge. He himself used the title of king in the only surviving official document that emanated from his chancery, and it was also used by the consul Basilius. Odoacer introduced few important changes into the administrative system of Italy. He had the support of the Roman Senate and was able to distribute land to his followers without much opposition. Unrest among his warriors led to violence in 477–478, but no such disturbances occurred during the later period of his reign. Although Odoacer was an Arian Christian, he rarely intervened in the affairs of the Trinitarian state church of the Roman Empire.

Likely of East Germanic descent, Odoacer was a military leader in Italy who led the revolt of Herulian, Rugian, and Scirian soldiers that deposed Romulus Augustulus on 4 September AD 476. (Eleven-year-old Augustulus had been declared Western Roman Emperor by his father Orestes, the rebellious general of the army in Italy, less than a year before, but had been unable to gain allegiance or recognition beyond central Italy.) With the backing of the Roman Senate, Odoacer thenceforth ruled Italy autonomously, paying lip service to the authority of Julius Nepos, the previous Western emperor, and Zeno, the emperor of the East. Upon Nepos's murder in 480 Odoacer invaded Dalmatia, to punish the murderers. He did so, executing the conspirators, but within two years also conquered the region and incorporated it into his domain.

When Illus, master of soldiers of the Eastern Empire, asked for Odoacer's help in 484 in his struggle to depose Zeno, Odoacer invaded Zeno's westernmost provinces. The emperor responded first by inciting the Rugii of present-day Austria to attack Italy. During the winter of 487–488 Odoacer crossed the Danube and defeated the Rugii in their own territory. Zeno also appointed the Ostrogoth Theodoric the Great, who was menacing the borders of the Eastern Empire, to be king of Italy, turning one troublesome ally against another.  Theodoric invaded Italy in 489 and by August 490 had captured almost the entire peninsula, forcing Odoacer to take refuge in Ravenna. The city surrendered on 5 March 493. Theodoric invited Odoacer to a banquet of reconciliation; instead of forging an alliance, Theodoric killed the unsuspecting king.

Ethnicity 
Except for the fact that he was not considered Roman, Odoacer's precise ethnic origins are not known. Some scholars believe his origins lie in the multi-ethnic empire of Attila. Most scholars consider him to be at least partly of Germanic descent, while others argue he was entirely Germanic. Early medieval sources such as Theophanes called him a Goth. Likewise, the 6th century chronicler Marcellinus Comes called him "king of the Goths" (Odoacer rex Gothorum).

Jordanes associated him with several of the East Germanic tribes of the Middle Danube who had arrived there during the time of Attila's empire, including the Sciri, Heruli, and Rugii. Notability, in several passages he associated him with the Turcilingi, which is a people, or perhaps a dynasty, that is mentioned by no other historical source. Their affiliations are unclear but they may have been Gothic, Hunnic or even precursors of the Thuringii. While in one passage in his Getica, Jordanes describes Odoacer as king of the Turcilingi (Torcilingorum rex) with Scirian and Heruli followers, in another passage (LVII.291), Jordanes mentions Italy during Odoacer's reign being under the tyranny of Turcilingi and Rogii. In his Romana, the same author defines Odoacer as a descendant of the Rugii (or of a person named Rogus, Odoacer genere Rogus) with Turcilingi, Scirian and Heruli followers. It has been pointed out that Attila had an uncle of the name Rogus and suggested that Odoacer may have been his descendant.

In a fragment from a history of Priscus, reproduced by John of Antioch, Odoacer is described as a man of the Sciri, the son of Edeco, and brother of Hunuulf who killed Armatus in the eastern Roman empire.

Much later, a memorial plate from 1521 found in the catacombe Chapel of St Maximus in Petersfriedhof—the burial site of St Peter's Abbey in Salzburg (Austria)—mentions Odoacer as King of "Rhutenes" or "Rhutenians", who invaded Noricum in 477. Due to its very late date of 1521 and several anachronistic elements, the content of that plate is considered nothing more than a legend. In spite of that, the plate has become a popular "source" for several theorists that try to connect Odoacer with ancient Celtic Ruthenes, and also with later Slavic Ruthenians. Historian Paul R. Magocsi argues such theories should be regarded as "inventive tales" of "creative" writers and nothing more.

Many historians, such as medieval scholar Michael Frasetto, accept that Odoacer was of Scirian heritage. Scholars are still to some extent divided about the evidence for Odoacer's father being a Hun, and also about the identity of the Turcilingi. There is some doubt about whether the name has been reported correctly by Jordanes, and whether they, and even the Sciri, were Germanic. Historian Bruce Macbain notes that the "ancient sources exhibit considerable confusion over Odovacer's tribal affiliation", but in point of fact none of them calls Odoacer a Hun. Historian Penny MacGeorge argues that Odoacer was likely half-Scirian and half-Thuringian. Historian Patrick Amory explains that "Odoacer is called a Scirian, a Rugian, a Goth or a Thuringian in sources; his father is called a Hun, his mother a Scirian. Odoacer's father Edeco was associated first with the Huns under Attila, and then with a group called Sciri, an ethnographic name that appears intermittently in fifth-century sources." This line of reasoning is also picked up on by historian Erik Jensen, who avows that Odoacer was born to a Gothic mother and that his father Edeco was a Hun.

Onomastic and other evidence 
The origin of the name Odoacer, which may give indications as to his tribal affiliation, is debated. One suggestion is that Odoacer is derived from the Germanic *Audawakraz (Gothic *Audawakrs), from aud- "wealth" and wakr- "vigilant" or, combined, "watcher of the wealth." This form finds a cognate in another Germanic language, the titular Eadwacer of the Old English poem Wulf and Eadwacer (where Old English renders the earlier Germanic sound au- as ea-). On the other hand, historians Robert L. Reynolds and Robert S. Lopez explored the possibility that the name Odoacer was not Germanic, making several arguments that his ethnic background might lie elsewhere. One of these is that his name, "Odoacer", for which they claimed an etymology in Germanic languages had not been convincingly found, could be a form of the Turkish "Ot-toghar" ("grass-born" or "fire-born"), or the shorter form "Ot-ghar" ("herder"). Reynolds and Lopez's thesis was criticized by Otto J. Maenschen-Helfen, who pointed out the speciousness of their etymological analysis, since names between Germans and Huns were being used reciprocally. Moreover, there is an often ignored fragment in the Suda that was almost certainly written by the well-informed contemporary, Malchus, who identified Odoacer as a Thuringian. Finally, a passage from Eugippius' Life of Saint Severinus indicated that Odoacer was so tall that he had to bend down to pass through the doorway, which Macbain consider another strong argument that he was unlikely to have been a Hun, since they were not known to be tall.

Before Italy 
Possibly the earliest recorded incident involving Odoacer is from a fragment of a chronicle preserved in the History of the Franks of Gregory of Tours. Two different chapters of his work mention military leaders with Odoacer's name, using two different spellings and involving two different regions.  
In the first mention, a confused or confusing report is given of a number of battles fought by King Childeric I of the Franks, Aegidius, Count Paul, and one "Adovacrius" (with an "a") who was leading a group of Saxons based at the mouth of the Loire. Though there is no consensus, some historians, such as Reynolds and Lopez, have suggested that this Adovacrius may be the same person as the future king of Italy. 
In a second mention by Gregory of Tours, an Odovacrius (with an "o") made an alliance with the same Childeric, and together they fought the Alamanni, who had been causing problems in Italy. This Odoacer, with his connection to the region north of Italy, and his "o" spelling, is probably the future king of Italy, before he was king.

The earliest supposed recorded event which is more certainly about Odoacer the future king, was shortly before he arrived in Italy. Eugippius, in his Life of Saint Severinus, records how a group of barbarians on their way to Italy had stopped to pay their respects to the holy man. Odoacer, at the time "a young man, of tall figure, clad in poor clothes", learned from Severinus that he would one day become famous. Despite the fact that Odoacer was an Arian Christian and Severinus was Catholic, the latter left a deep impression on him. When Odoacer took his leave, Severinus made one final comment which proved prophetic: "Go to Italy, go, now covered with mean hides; soon you will make rich gifts to many."

Leader of the foederati 
By 470, Odoacer had become an officer in what remained of the Roman Army. Although Jordanes writes of Odoacer as invading Italy "as leader of the Sciri, the Heruli and allies of various races", modern writers describe him as being part of the Roman military establishment, based on John of Antioch's statement that Odoacer was on the side of Ricimer at the beginning of his battle with the emperor Anthemius in 472. In his capacity as a soldier suddenly pitted against Anthemius, since he had switched sides to join with Ricimer, Odoacer had "hastened the emperor's downfall."

When Orestes was in 475 appointed Magister militum and patrician by the Western Roman Emperor Julius Nepos, Odoacer became head of the Germanic foederati of Italy (the ScirianHerulic foederati). Under the command of Orestes were significant contingents of Germanic peoples made up mostly of Rugii and Heruli tribesmen. Before the end of that year Orestes had rebelled and driven Nepos from Italy. Orestes then proclaimed his young son Romulus the new emperor as Romulus Augustus, called "Augustulus" (31 October). At this time, Odoacer was a soldier rising through the ranks. However, Nepos reorganized his court in Salona, Dalmatia and received homage and affirmation from the remaining fragments of the Western Empire beyond Italy and, most importantly, from Constantinople, which refused to accept Augustulus, Zeno having branded him and his father as traitors and usurpers.

About this time the foederati, who had been quartered in Italy all of these years, had grown weary of this arrangement. In the words of J. B. Bury, "They desired to have roof-trees and lands of their own, and they petitioned Orestes to reward them for their services, by granting them lands and settling them permanently in Italy". Orestes refused their petition, and they turned to Odoacer to lead their revolt against Orestes. Orestes was killed at Placentia along with his brother Paulus outside Ravenna. The Germanic foederati, the Scirians and the Heruli, as well as a large segment of the Italic Roman army, then proclaimed Odoacer rex ("king") on 23 August 476. Odoacer then advanced to Ravenna and captured the city, compelling the young emperor Romulus to abdicate on 4 September. According to the Anonymus Valesianus, Odoacer was moved by Romulus's youth and his beauty to not only spare his life but give him a pension of 6,000 solidi and sent him to Campania to live with his relatives.

Following Romulus Augustus's deposition, according to the historian Malchus, upon hearing of the accession of Zeno to the throne, the Senate in Rome sent an embassy to the Eastern Emperor and bestowed upon him the Western imperial insignia. The message was clear: the West no longer required a separate Emperor, for "one monarch sufficed [to rule] the world". In response, Zeno accepted their gifts and this essentially brought to end any puppet emperors in the West, with Nepos banished and Anthemius dead. The Eastern Emperor then conferred upon Odoacer the title of Patrician and granted him legal authority to govern Italy in the name of Rome, as dux Italiae. Zeno also suggested that Odoacer should receive Nepos back as Emperor in the West, "if he truly wished to act with justice." Although he accepted the title of Patrician and Dux from Zeno, Odoacer did not invite Julius Nepos to return to Rome, and the latter remained in Dalmatia until his death. Odoacer was careful to observe form, however, and made a pretence of acting on Nepos's authority, even issuing coins with both his image and that of Zeno. Following Nepos's murder in 480, who was killed while waiting in Dalmatia, Zeno became sole Emperor.

Bury, however, disagrees that Odoacer's assumption of power marked the fall of the Western Roman Empire:

King of Italy  

In 476, Odoacer was proclaimed rex by his soldiers and dux Italiae by emperor Zeno, initiating a new era over Roman lands. According to Jordanes, at the beginning of his reign he "slew Count Bracila at Ravenna that he might inspire a fear of himself among the Romans." He took many military actions to strengthen his control over Italy and its neighboring areas. He achieved a solid diplomatic coup by inducing the Vandal king Gaiseric to cede Sicily to him. Noting that "Odovacar seized power in August of 476, Gaiseric died in January 477, and the sea usually became closed to navigation around the beginning of November", F.M. Clover dates this cession to September or October 476. When Julius Nepos was murdered by two of his retainers in his country house near Salona (9 May 480), Odoacer assumed the duty of pursuing and executing the assassins, and at the same time established his own rule in Dalmatia.

As Bury points out, "It is highly important to observe that Odovacar established his political power with the co-operation of the Roman Senate, and this body seems to have given him their loyal support throughout his reign, so far as our meagre sources permit us to draw inferences." He regularly nominated members of the Senate to the Consulate and other prestigious offices: "Basilius, Decius, Venantius, and Manlius Boethius held the consulship and were either Prefects of Rome or Praetorian Prefects; Symmachus and Sividius were consuls and Prefects of Rome; another senator of old family, Cassiodorus, was appointed a minister of finance." A. H. M. Jones also notes that under Odoacer the Senate acquired "enhanced prestige and influence" in order to counter any desires for restoration of Imperial rule. As the most tangible example of this renewed prestige, for the first time since the mid-3rd century copper coins were issued with the legend S(enatus) C(onsulto). Jones describes these coins as "fine big copper pieces", which were "a great improvement on the miserable little nummi hitherto current", and not only were they copied by the Vandals in Africa, but they formed the basis of the currency reform by Anastasius in the Eastern Empire.

Although Odoacer was an Arian Christian, his relations with the Chalcedonian church hierarchy were remarkably good. As G.M. Cook notes in her introduction to Magnus Felix Ennodius' Life of Saint Epiphanius, he showed great esteem for Bishop Epiphanius: in response to the bishop's petition, Odoacer granted the inhabitants of Liguria a five-year immunity from taxes, and again granted his requests for relief from abuses by the praetorian prefect. The biography of Pope Felix III in the Liber Pontificalis openly states that the pontiff's tenure occurred during Odoacer's reign without any complaints about the king being registered.

In 487/488, Odoacer led his army to victory against the Rugians in Noricum, taking their king Feletheus into captivity; when word that Feletheus' son, Fredericus, had returned to his people, Odoacer sent his brother Onoulphus with an army back to Noricum against him. Onoulphus found it necessary to evacuate the remaining Romans and resettled them in Italy. The remaining Rugians fled and took refuge with the Ostrogoths; the abandoned province was settled by the Lombards by 493.

Fall and death 

As Odoacer's position improved, Zeno, the Eastern Emperor, increasingly saw him as a rival. Odoacer exchanged messages with Illus, who had been in open revolt against Zeno since 484. Switching allegiances, Zeno subsequently sought to destroy Odoacer and then promised Theodoric the Great and his Ostrogoths the Italian peninsula if they were to defeat and remove Odoacer. As both Herwig Wolfram and Peter Heather point out, Theodoric had his own reasons to agree to this offer: "Theodoric had enough experience to know (or at least suspect) that Zeno would not, in the long term, tolerate his independent power. When Theodoric rebelled in 485, we are told, he had in mind Zeno's treatment of Armatus. Armatus defected from Basilicus to Zeno in 476, and was made senior imperial general for life. Within a year, Zeno had him assassinated."

In 489, Theodoric led the Ostrogoths across the Julian Alps and into Italy. On 28 August, Odoacer met him at the Isonzo, only to be defeated. He withdrew to Verona, reaching its outskirts on 27 September, where he immediately set up a fortified camp. Theodoric followed him and three days later defeated him again. While Odoacer took refuge in Ravenna, Theodoric continued across Italy to Mediolanum, where the majority of Odoacer's army, including his chief general Tufa, surrendered to the Ostrogothic king. Theodoric had no reason to doubt Tufa's loyalty and dispatched his new general to Ravenna with a band of elite soldiers. Herwig Wolfram observes, "[b]ut Tufa changed sides, the Gothic elite force entrusted to his command was destroyed, and Theodoric suffered his first serious defeat on Italian soil." Theodoric recoiled by seeking safety in Ticinum. Odoacer emerged from Ravenna and started to besiege his rival. While both were fully engaged, the Burgundians seized the opportunity to plunder and devastated Liguria. Many Romans were taken into captivity, and did not regain their freedom until Theodoric ransomed them three years later.

The following summer, the Visigothic king Alaric II demonstrated what Wolfram calls "one of the rare displays of Gothic solidarity" and sent military aid to help his kinsman, forcing Odoacer to raise his siege. Theodoric emerged from Ticinum, and on 11 August 490, the armies of the two kings clashed on the Adda River. Odoacer again was defeated and forced back into Ravenna, where Theodoric besieged him. Ravenna proved to be invulnerable, surrounded by marshes and estuaries and easily supplied by small boats from its hinterlands, as Procopius later pointed out in his History. Further, Tufa remained at large in the strategic valley of the Adige near Trent, and received unexpected reinforcements when dissent amongst Theodoric's ranks led to sizable desertions. That same year, the Vandals took their turn to strike while both sides were fully engaged and invaded Sicily. While Theodoric was engaged with them, his ally Fredericus, king of the Rugians, began to oppress the inhabitants of Pavia, whom the latter's forces had been garrisoned to protect. Once Theodoric intervened in person in late August, 491, his punitive acts drove Fredericus to desert with his followers to Tufa.

By this time, however, Odoacer appeared to have lost all hope of victory. A large-scale sortie he sent out of Ravenna on the night of 9/10 July 491 ended in failure, during which his commander-in-chief, Livilia, along with the best of his Herulian soldiers were killed. On 29 August 492, the Goths were about to assemble enough ships at Rimini to set up an effective blockade of Ravenna. Despite these decisive losses, the war dragged on until 25 February 493 when John, bishop of Ravenna, was able to negotiate a treaty between Theodoric and Odoacer to occupy Ravenna together and share joint rule. After a three-year siege, Theodoric entered the city on 5 March. Odoacer died ten days later, slain by Theodoric while they shared a meal. Theodoric had plotted to have a group of his followers kill him while the two kings were feasting together in the imperial palace of Honorius "Ad Laurentum" ("At the Laurel Grove"); when this plan went astray, Theodoric drew his sword and struck him on the collarbone. In response to Odoacer's dying question, "Where is God?" Theodoric cried, "This is what you did to my friends." Theodoric was said to have stood over the body of his dead rival and exclaimed, "The man has no bones in his body."

Not only did Theodoric slay Odoacer, he thereafter had the betrayed king's loyal followers hunted down and killed as well, an event which left him as the master of Italy.{{efn|According to one account, "That same day, all of Odoacer's army who could be found anywhere were killed by order of Theodoric, as well as all of his family."{{efn|See:Anonymus Valesianus 11.56}}}} Odoacer's wife Sunigilda was stoned to death, and his brother Onoulphus was killed by archers while seeking refuge in a church. Theodoric exiled Odoacer's son Thela to Gaul, but when he attempted to return to Italy Theodoric had him killed. Despite the tragic ending of his domain, followers, and family, Odoacer left an important legacy, in that, he had laid the foundations for a great kingdom in Italy for Theodoric to exploit.

 Later portrayals 
 The Old High German Hildebrandslied mentions Odoacer (as Otacher) as the person who drove Hildebrand from his home.
 The famous Old English poem 'Wulf and Eadwacer' has been thought to be a legendary retelling of part of Odoacer's story. 
 Odoacer is depicted in Valerio Massimo Manfredi's 2002 novel The Last Legion, and portrayed by Peter Mullan in its 2007 film adaptation.
The movie 476 A.D. Chapter One: The Last Light of Aries'' about Romulus Augustus's deposition by Odoacer, the Chieftain of the Ostrogoths, and the End of the Roman Empire, was released in 2013, by Ivan Pavletić.

See also 
 Alaric I
 Gaiseric
 Germanic peoples
 Barbarian invasions

Notes

References

Sources

Further reading 
 

430s births
493 deaths
5th-century kings of Italy
5th-century Arian Christians
5th-century monarchs in Europe
5th-century murdered monarchs
Germanic rulers
Germanic warriors
Thuringian people
Sciri
Huns
Deaths by blade weapons
Magistri militum of Hunnic descent
Patricii
Kings of Italian states
Founding monarchs
States and territories established in the 470s
States and territories disestablished in the 5th century